Vorstermans is a surname. Notable people with the surname include:

Ismo Vorstermans (born 1989), Dutch footballer 
Johannes Vorstermans ( 1643- 1719), Dutch painter